Transylvanosaurus (meaning "lizard from across the forest") is an extinct genus of rhabdodontid ornithopod dinosaur from the Late Cretaceous (Maastrichtian) Hateg Basin of Romania. The type species is Transylvanosaurus platycephalus, known from a fragmentary skull.

Discovery and naming
The holotype specimen, LPB (FGGUB) R.2070, was found in 2007 in the ‘Pui Beds’ in the Bărbat River Valley section of Haţeg Basin, Hunedoara County, Romania. This locality is dated to the middle Maastrichtian age of the Late Cretaceous period. It consists of a fragmentary skull, including the articulated basicranium and articulated frontals.

In 2022, Transylvanosaurus platycephalus was described as a new genus and species of rhabdodontid ornithopod dinosaurs by Felix J. Augustin, Dylan Bastiaans, Mihai D. Dumbravă, and Zoltán Csiki-Sava based on these remains. The generic name, "Transylvanosaurus", is derived from the Latin words "trans", meaning "across" and "silva", meaning "forest", and the Greek word "sauros", meaning "lizard" (σαύρος). The generic name references Transylvania, the region that contains the type locality of the genus in the Haţeg Basin . The specific name, "platycephalus", combines the Greek words "platys" (πλατύς), meaning wide, and "kephale" (κεφαλῇ), meaning head, in reference to the unusual width of the skull compared to related taxa.

Classification 
In their phylogenetic analyses, Augustin et al. (2022) recovered Transylvanosaurus as a member of the Rhabdodontidae. The cladogram below displays the results of their phylogenetic analyses.

Despite these results, Augustin et al. propose "particularly close relationships" with Rhabdodon based on morphological comparisons.

References 

Iguanodonts
Late Cretaceous dinosaurs of Europe
Maastrichtian life
Cretaceous Romania
Fossils of Romania
Fossil taxa described in 2022
Ornithischian genera